Richard Wagner (1813–1883) was a German Romantic composer.

Richard Wagner may also refer to:

People 

 Richard Wagner (judge) (born 1957), Canadian judge, 18th Chief Justice of Canada (2017–present)
 Richard Wagner (novelist) (1952–2023), Romanian-German novelist
 Richard E. Wagner (born 1941), American economist
 Richard K. Wagner, American psychologist and professor
 Richard Paul Wagner (1882–1953), Chief of Design for Deutsche Reichsbahn 1922–1942; responsible for standard locomotive designs

Places 

 Richard Wagner Platz (Berlin), a Berlin square
 Richard-Wagner-Straße (Munich), a Munich street
 Richard-Wagner-Platz (Leipzig), a square in Leipzig
 Richard-Wagner-Platz (Berlin U-Bahn), a Berlin railway station
 Richard Wagner Monument, in Berlin's Tiergarten
 Richard-Wagner-Festspielhaus, an opera house used by the Bayreuth festival

Other 

 Richard Wagner Festival, also known as the Bayreuth festival 
 Richard Wagner Conservatory, a Viennese music school
 Richard Wagner Foundation

See also 
Rick Wagner, American football player
Rick Wagoner, American business executive
 Wagner (disambiguation)
 Wagner (surname)
 List of compositions by Richard Wagner
 International Association of Wagner Societies